Victoria Gap is an area and a mountain pass located between the summits of Victoria Peak (aka. Mount Austin) and Mount Gough, on Hong Kong Island, in Hong Kong. It is the most touristic place within the area referred to as The Peak, which receives some seven million visitors every year.

Features
As a tourist destination, Victoria Gap features several attractions:
 Views of Central, Victoria Harbour and Kowloon Peninsula
 The Peak Tower, a leisure and shopping complex
 The Peak Galleria, a leisure and shopping complex
 The Peak Lookout, a restaurant housed in a historic building
 Lions Pavilion, a viewing pavilion

Transport
The upper terminal of the Peak Tram is located below the Peak Tower at Victoria Gap.

See also
 List of gaps in Hong Kong

References

External links
 

Gaps of Hong Kong
Tourist attractions in Hong Kong
Victoria Peak